Occupation of Poland may refer to:
 Partitions of Poland (1795-1914)
 The German Government General of Warsaw and the Austrian Military Government of Lublin during World War I
 Occupation of Poland (1939–1945) during World War II
 Soviet influence over Poland after World War II (1945-1989)